Julia Franck (born 1970, in East Berlin) is a German writer.

Life
Julia Franck, a twin, is the daughter of the actress Anna Katharina Franck and of the television producer Jürgen Sehmisch.

In 1978 the family moved to West Berlin where they spent nine months in a refugee camp. She grew up in Schleswig-Holstein. Franck studied German Literature and American Studies at the Free University of Berlin and spent some time in the United States, Mexico and Guatemala. She worked as an editor for Sender Freies Berlin and contributed to various newspapers and magazines. She lives with her children in Berlin.

Literary works
Franck is the author of five novels, one short story collections, and the editor of a collection of essays. Her three most recent novels, and Rücken an Rücken, as well as the collection Grenzübergänge, engage explicitly with twentieth-century German history. Lagerfeuer is set in the West Berlin refugee camp Berlin-Marienfelde in the 1970s and follows four main characters, one of whom, Nelly Senff, has fled East Berlin with her two young children. Rücken an Rücken is also set during the years of Germany's division, ending in the early 1960s, and Die Mittagsfrau spans from World War I to divided Germany of the 1950s.

Although Franck has not described herself as a feminist author, feminist scholars have noted her presentation of women's experience of history, power structures, sexuality, and relationships (such as motherhood).

Franck's books have been translated into over 35 languages.

Family connections
Franck is the granddaughter of sculptor Ingeborg Hunzinger (1915–2009) and a great granddaughter of the artist and illustrator Philipp Franck (1860–1944).

Awards and honours
 1995 Open Mike prize of the Literaturwerkstatt Berlin
 1998 Alfred-Döblin-Stipendium of the Akademie der Künste
 2000 3sat award of the Ingeborg Bachmann competition
 2004 Marie Luise Kaschnitz Prize
 2005 Roswitha Prize of the city of Bad Gandersheim
 2007 German Book Prize
 2010 short list for the Independent Foreign Fiction Prize for Blind Side of the Heart
 2010 short list for the Wingate Literary Prize for the Jewish Quarterly
 2022 Schiller Memorial Prize

Memberships
 2022

Works

English translations

Translations

Film adaptions 
 West (director: Christian Schwochow), a 2013 German film adaptation of the novel Lagerfeuer.

References

1970 births
Living people
German people of Jewish descent
Waldorf school alumni
Writers from Berlin
German women writers
German-language writers
German Book Prize winners